Gökçe Bahadır (born 9 November 1981) is a Turkish film and television actress. She is best known for her performances as Leyla Tekin in the series Yaprak Dökümü (based on classic novel of Reşat Nuri Güntekin), and as Yeliz in hit youth series Hayat Bilgisi. She has starred in numerous other series including Kayıp Şehir, Ufak Tefek Cinayetler, Aramızda Kalsın, Adı Efsane, and Dedemin İnsanları. As of 2021, she is the lead role in the TV series Evlilik Hakkında Her Şey, an adaptation of the British TV series The Split.

Credits

Discography

References

External links
 

1981 births
Living people
Actresses from Istanbul
Turkish film actresses
Turkish television actresses